The Baltimore City Fire Department (BCFD) provides fire protection and emergency medical services to the city of Baltimore, Maryland, United States. The BCFD responds to approximately 235,000 emergency calls annually. There are two International Association of Fire Fighters (IAFF) locals; IAFF 734 for firefighters and IAFF 964 for officers.

History
Baltimore's early firefighting was performed by volunteers. The various companies engaged in serious rivalries, resulting in what a Baltimore mayor termed "irregularities". For example, gangs operating out of firehouses participated in the Know-Nothing Riot of 1856. A municipal organization was established in 1859.

The Great Baltimore Fire in 1904 burned for 30 hours straight and decimated a major part of central Baltimore, including over 1,500 buildings. Mutual aid companies from as far away as Washington D.C., Philadelphia and New York City were called in to assist. The fire led to uniform national standards in fire fighting equipment and protocols. As with other large fires of the time, it was a predecessor to the stringent fire codes of today.

Operations
The Baltimore City Fire Department responds from 38 fire stations located throughout the city. The BCFD operates 32 engine companies, 17 truck companies, 3 squad companies, 1 rescue company, 2 fireboats, 20 full-time advanced life support medic units, 7 full-time basic life support ambulances, 4 peak time basic life support ambulances, and numerous special, support, and reserve units. These companies and units are organized into seven battalions, six fire and one EMS, each under the command of a battalion chief. Each battalion chief reports to the on-duty shift commander.

Staffing
All engine companies, squad companies, truck companies, and the rescue company are staffed with a minimum of four personnel on each shift. There are tractor drawn aerials, rear mount ladders, and one tower ladder in the department. Each engine company and squad company is staffed by either a lieutenant or captain, a pump operator (driver), and two firefighters on each shift. Each truck company is staffed by a lieutenant or captain, one emergency vehicle driver (EVD), and two firefighters if it is a rear mount truck ladder truck, or two emergency vehicle drivers and one firefighter if it is a tractor drawn aerial. The rescue company is staffed by a lieutenant or captain, an EVD and two firefighters. The captain of a Baltimore City Fire Department fire company is in command of that company. In a fire station with more than one fire company, the senior captain of one of the two or more companies is the "house captain", in command of that fire station. Each Baltimore City Fire Department Medic unit is staffed by two personnel each shift, one of whom is an advanced life support provider. Each Baltimore City Fire Department ambulance is staffed by two EMT personnel each shift. Each battalion chief's unit is operated by a battalion chief.

Response profiles 
All emergency responses are dispatched to field units by the Fire Communications Bureau using pre-determined response profiles from the computer-aided dispatch system. Units can be special-called by any field unit once an incident is underway; however, the greater alarm system is typically used to request additional resources.  Where the response calls for an engine company, the responding unit could be an engine company OR squad company. These are the responses and units assigned:

 Silent Alarm (1 Engine Company or Squad Company and/or 1 Truck Company): Vehicle fire, brush fire, trash fire, activated fire alarm system, odor investigations, minor spills
 Tactical Box (2 Engine Companies or Squad Companies & 1 Truck Company): Structural fires reported extinguished; electrical fires; appliance fires
 Task Force Alarm (1 Battalion Chief Unit, 3 Engine Companies or Squad Companies & 1 Truck Company): detached garage fires; tractor trailer fires; fires involving light rail or mass transit buses
 Box Alarm (2 Battalion Chief Units, 6 Engine Companies or Squad Companies, 2 Truck Companies, 1 Medic Unit [& Rescue Company 1 and fire boats in certain areas]): fire reported in structure. 1 of the 6 engine companies will be a rapid intervention team (RIT) to rescue downed firefighters, 1 engine of the 6 engine companies will be the accountability unit to maintain accountability of members operating on a fireground. The accountability unit was brought about after the line of duty deaths of 3 firefighters. Lieutenant Paul Butrim, Lieutenant Kelsey Sadler, Firefighter Kenneth Lacayo died on Jan 24, 2022 from a building collapse in West Baltimore.
 Rescue Alarm (1 Battalion Chief Unit & EMS Battalion Chief Unit, 1 Engine Company, 1 Truck Company, 1 Squad Company, Rescue Company 1, 1 EMS unit, & 1 EMS officer unit): any entrapment, typically a vehicle accident with trapped persons. Special units added for specialized/technical rescues, such as harbor, swift water, building collapse, trench collapse, confined space, high angle.

Apparatus 
The Baltimore City Fire Department utilizes a variety of standardized and specialized apparatus to carry out its duties. The apparatus assigned to the Baltimore City Fire Department are:
 
 Engine companies - The engine company is the backbone of the fire suppression operation. Every Baltimore City Fire Department engine is manufactured by Pierce and has a 500-gallon water tank. Engine companies carry a basic assortment of hose lines,appliances and adapters,forcible entry hand tools,medical equipment,five-gas air monitoring equipment,and a hand-held thermal imager along with other equipment. Most first line engine companies have a 1,500 GPM single stage pump. Basic hose line complement is 1,200' of 4" 'Stortz' supply hose, 250' of 2.5" attack line, 300' of 3" setback/standpipe hose, 500' of 1.75" attack line, and 20' of hard suction hose. Engine companies have a daily minimum staffing of four; one Pump Operator or Acting Pump Operator, one officer (Captain, Lieutenant, or Acting Lieutenant), and two firefighters. 
 Truck companies - The truck company is a vital part of the suppression operation in the Baltimore City Fire Department. there are Tiller Trucks also known as Tractor Drawn Aerial ladder trucks and straight body aerial ladder trucks. Every truck company is outfitted with a minimum 100' aerial ladder, an assortment of portable ground ladders, an extensive complement of forcible entry tools, a Holmatro portable power unit with a combination tool, which is a mini version of the "Jaws of Life", several gasoline-powered ventilation and demolition saws, an electric reciprocating saw,medical equipment,a four-gas air monitor,a thermal imager,and a rapid intervention kit including a RIT air pack and they carry other equipment. The Baltimore City Fire Department's fleet of ladder trucks is made up of both straight-body aerial Ladder trucks and tractor-drawn aerial Ladder trucks ("tillers"). Daily staffing of truck companies vary between straight-body trucks and Tractor Drawn Aerial ladder trucks; a straight-body aerial ladder truck is staffed by an Emergency Vehicle Driver (EVD) or acting Emergency Vehicle Driver (Acting EVD), an officer (Captain, Lieutenant, or Acting Lieutenant), and two firefighters, while a Tractor Drawn Aerial ladder truck is staffed with two Emergency Vehicle Drivers (EVDs) or Acting Emergency Vehicle Drivers (Acting EVDs), an officer or acting officer, and one firefighter. An additional firefighter may be assigned to certain truck companies during times of increased staffing.
 Squad companies - the squad company concept in Baltimore combines a basic engine company with a medium rescue company. Squad companies carry all of the same equipment as an engine company, plus a complete set of Holmatro hydraulic rescue tools, including Spreaders, Cutters, Rams, and Combi Tools, known as the "Jaws of Life", cribbing, pneumatic  rescue airbags, gasoline-powered ventilation and demolition saws, advanced air monitoring equipment, basic Haz-Mat equipment, basic water rescue equipment, and tools to free occupants from stalled elevators along with other equipment. On a structural fire response, squad companies operate exactly as engine companies would, and squad companies have the same staffing as engine companies. Additionally, squad companies may be assigned to conduct Truck Company or Rescue Company operations such as forcible entry, search, or ventilation or respond to rescue calls such as motor vehicle accidents, collapse rescue calls, etc.
 Heavy rescue company - Surprisingly, Baltimore city has historically been one of few large cities to have only one dedicated heavy rescue company. Rescue 1 is stationed in Downtown Baltimore, and responds on all reports of persons trapped, regardless of the situation. It is equipped with two complete sets of Holmatro hydraulic rescue tools, including Spreaders,Cutters,Rams and Combi Tools,known as the "Jaws Of Life",a generous assortment of cribbing and struts for stabilization, high and low pressure airbag systems, numerous specialized power saws,drills,air hammers,and associated power tools as well as an inflatable rescue boat, swift-and cold-water rescue suits and water rescue equipment,trench shoring equipment,equipment for structural collapse,a rescue tripod and confined space rescue equipment,a rapid intervention kit including RIT air pack, and scene lighting along with other tools and equipment. Rescue 1 is part of the Special Operations Command, and responds to all rescue situations citywide, as well as all second alarm fires. Either three or four members are assigned to the Rescue Company apparatus.
 Fire boat - One Class A fire boat is maintained by the BCFD. Fire Boat 1, the "John R. Frazier", is 87' in length and is rated for pumping more than 7,000 gallons per minute of water from sea level, realistically closer to 13,000. It is equipped with an on-board supply of 1,000 gallons of AFFF fire-fighting foam for battling hydrocarbon fires, has a complete supply of fire-fighting hoses and appliances, a full complement of Holmatro rescue tools, advanced life support medical equipment, and a full-service mass casualty medical treatment area. In addition to the on-board deluge monitors, the vessel is also capable of supplying water to land-based units. Fire Boat 1 is staffed by four members; a marine pilot, two marine engineers and an officer (Captain, Lieutenant, or acting Lieutenant). It is the only full-service, full-sized fire boat for the Chesapeake Bay.  
 Fire rescue boats - Two fire rescue boats are maintained by the BCFD.  One is in frontline service and the other is in ready reserve status.  The fire rescue boats are 30' in length and capable of pumping 1,500 gallons per minute of water from draft. They are equipped with Advanced life support medical equipment. The size of these vessels allows them to enter marinas and areas inaccessible by Fire Boat 1.  Fire Rescue Boat 1 is staffed by two Emergency Boat Operators.  
 AirFLEX unit - This vehicle incorporates three special service fireground support functions into one apparatus. The first service is air cascade and breathing apparatus support. AirFLEX units are equipped with a supply of extra, full SCBA cylinders and a cascade and compressor for filling SCBA and SCUBA cylinders at the scene of incidents, as well as basic repair service supplies for SCBA components. AirFLEX units can also provide static breathing air via air lines for specialized rescues such as confined space, etc. The second service is floodlight service. Historically, in the fire service, before every front-line apparatus was equipped with power inverters, generators, and scene lighting, stand-alone floodlight units responded to support night-time operations. Original AirFLEX units were equipped with multiple portable floodlight fixtures for such operations, but have adapted to current needs; modern AirFLEX units are equipped with mobile light towers for scene lighting at incidents. The third service is high-expansion foam. Each AirFLEX unit is equipped with a high expansion foam generator, a supply of foam concentrate, and the delivery hose. High-expansion foam is traditionally used for stubborn fires in below-grade or confined environments, where water cannot adequately penetrate, and entry by firefighters is unsafe or unrealistic. In addition to the three "namesake" services provided, AirFLEX units also provide drinking water for fire scenes, and a supply of freshly charged portable radio batteries for extended incidents. AirFLEX units are staffed by one Emergency Vehicle Driver (or acting EVD). Two front-line AirFLEX units are in service continuously, splitting the city east and west of Charles Street for primary service. An AirFLEX unit is dispatched on working fires, or fires where the Fire Communications Bureau believes that the balance of companies will be utilizing SCBA. An AirFLEX unit is also dispatched automatically on any report of a fire in an ocean-going ship at port, fires below grade (tunnels), and on responses where the SCUBA team is utilized.  
 HAZ-MAT response units - The Baltimore City Fire Department utilizes two first-line Hazardous Materials (HAZ-MAT) response units. HAZMAT-1 is a full-service response unit equipped with an extensive cache of equipment for all types of hazards, including chemical, biological, radiological, nuclear, and explosive (CBRNE) incidents. Equipment includes computerized sensors and databases for identifying unknown potentially hazardous substances; static and dynamic air sampling and monitoring equipment; personnel protective equipment for all levels of incidents; spill control and overpack equipment; damming and diking supplies; personnel decontamination supplies; command and control equipment, including an indoors command post and a variety of other tools and equipment.  Alternatively, HAZMAT-3 is a spill control unit, built on a commercial "plumbers body" utility truck. HAZMAT-3 responds to the bulk of HAZMAT requests, and carries bulk absorbent and spill control supplies for hydrocarbon spills (ruptured fuel tanks, heating oil spills, etc.). HAZMAT-3 is also equipped with a pump-off device for removing remaining hydrocarbon fuel from a damaged storage vessel. HAZMAT-1 and HAZMAT-3 are cross-staffed by a single HAZMAT-trained Emergency Vehicle Driver. If both units are needed simultaneously, the on-duty HAZ-MAT coordinator, or a member of the HAZ-MAT task force will bring the second unit to the scene.

Stations and apparatus

In popular culture
The movie Ladder 49 portrays the BCFD, with a fictional truck company (referred to as a ladder company in the film). Members of the BCFD served as advisors for the film.

Frequencies 
The Baltimore City Fire Department operates on a 800mhz APCO-25 Phase 1 digital system. This is a list of simulcast VHF frequencies to program into a scanner or radio to listen to BCFD radio communication:

Baltimore civil unrest of 2015 

During the civil unrest in Baltimore that took place from April 27, 2015 to April 28, the Baltimore Fire Department was backed up with multiple calls and also battled against rioters. Many fire trucks were damaged by rioters; bottles and rocks were thrown at the trucks as they were responding to incidents. In one case there is also video footage of a citizen cutting a fire truck's fire hose in an effort to hinder its effectiveness. The Baltimore Fire Department responded to 144 vehicle fires and 15 structure fires during the course of the unrest. Many surrounding areas such as Howard County Fire & Rescue, Anne Arundel County Fire Department and Prince George's County Fire Department sent crews to Baltimore to help the Baltimore Fire Department during the riots.

References

External links

Fire departments in Maryland
Government of Baltimore
1797 establishments in Maryland
1859 establishments in Maryland